"Papi Chulo" is a song performed by British rapper and singer-songwriter Octavian and English rapper Skepta. It was released as a single on 13 March 2020 through Black Butter Records. The song peaked at number 37 on the UK Singles Chart.

Music video
A music video to accompany the release of "Papi Chulo" was first released onto YouTube on 13 March 2020. Rappers ASAP Ferg, ASAP Nast, and Michael Phantom all make cameo appearances.

Charts

Certifications

References

2020 songs
2020 singles
Skepta songs